The German Committee for the Freeing of Russian Jews (German, 'Deutsches Komitee zur Befreiung der russischen Juden') was created in August 1914 by Max Bodenheimer with Franz Oppenheimer, Adolf Friedman and Leo Motzkin to lobby for the socio-political liberation of Jewish people living in the Russian Empire and ensure their protection from pogroms. In November 1914 it was renamed the Committee for the East.

The Committee was initially supported by the German Empire but as no Jewish insurrection arose against the Russians the Germans soon lost interest

References

Further reading
 Deutsch-jüdische Geschichte in der Neuzeit by Michael A. Meyer, Steven M Lowenstein, Michael Brenner, Mordechai Breuer, Leo Baeck Institute
 Dokumente zur Geschichte des deutschen Zionismus 1882-1933 by Jehuda Reinharz

1914 establishments in Germany
Organizations established in 1914
Jewish political organizations
 
Opposition to antisemitism in Europe
Jewish organisations based in Germany
Russian diaspora in Germany
Russian-Jewish diaspora in Europe